Olympic College is a public community college in Bremerton, Washington. It opened as Olympic Junior College on September 5, 1946. Olympic College serves Kitsap and Mason counties in Washington.  The college's service area contains two major naval installations: Naval Base Kitsap and Naval Hospital Bremerton.

History
Olympic College has attracted dignitaries and well-known performers during its history. Harry S Truman, the 33rd President of the United States, visited Bremerton and Olympic College (then known as Olympic Junior College) in 1948. He received the first honorary degree from the college that year.

In 2015, Olympic College was named as one of ten finalists for the Aspen Prize for Community College Excellence, the nation's preeminent recognition of high achievement and performance in America's community colleges.

For their inaugural season in 2012, the Kitsap Admirals used the Bremer Student Center as their home venue. The team has since relocated to more suburban Silverdale at Olympic High School.

Academics
The college offers bachelor's degrees. Through partnerships with local universities like Washington State University and Western Washington University, students can also complete an associate degree with Olympic College then transfer into a partner program to earn a bachelor's degree without having to leave Kitsap County.

Campus
The college's main campus is a  site located in Bremerton, Washington, and its two satellite campuses are located in Poulsbo and Shelton, Washington.

The land for both the Shelton and Poulsbo campuses was donated. The 27 acres of land that is now the Shelton campus was donated by Simpson Timber in 1991 and the 20 acres of land that is now the Poulsbo campus was donated by the Olhava Family in 1993.

Enrollment
The student body is predominantly full-time (59%), between the ages of 20–29 (37.7%), and slightly more female than male (56% female).  At 73% white, the student body is more diverse than the two counties in which its campuses are located (Kitsap 84% white, Mason 89%), and is more like Seattle (70% white) in King County, which is an hour's ferry ride from Bremerton across the waters of Puget Sound.

References

External links
 Official website

Bremerton, Washington
Community colleges in Washington (state)
Universities and colleges accredited by the Northwest Commission on Colleges and Universities
Educational institutions established in 1946
Education in Kitsap County, Washington
Buildings and structures in Kitsap County, Washington
1946 establishments in Washington (state)